Cecil Thomas may refer to:

Cecil Thomas (cricketer) (1926-1996), Guyanese cricketer
Cecil Thomas (journalist) (1883–1960), British newspaper editor
Cecil Thomas (politician) (born 1952), Ohio politician 
Cecil Thomas (sculptor) (1885–1976), British sculptor
Cecil V. Thomas (1892–1947), American educator

See also
Thomas Cecil (disambiguation)